Lego Minions: The Rise of Gru was a Lego theme based on the film of the same name. It is licensed from Universal Pictures and Illumination. The theme was first introduced in March 2020. It was eventually discontinued by the end of December 2022.

Overview
Lego Minions: The Rise of Gru is based on the Minions: The Rise of Gru film and focuses on the story of how the Minions helped a young Gru become the character audiences met in Despicable Me. Lego Minions: The Rise of Gru aimed to recreate the main characters in Lego form, including Bob, Gru, Kevin, Otto and Stuart.

Launch
The Lego Minions: The Rise of Gru was launched at the New York Toy Fair in 2020. To celebrate the partnership between Universal Pictures and The Lego Group, 22 brick-built Lego Minions have appeared on the show floor at the Crystal Palace Mezzanine. As part of the marketing campaign, The Lego Group released two toy sets based on the film and while the three sets delayed until 2021. Each set featured a different vehicles, lab or building. Minifigures were also released, including Bob, Gru, Kevin, Otto and Stuart.

Toy line

Construction sets
According to Bricklink, The Lego Group released a total of 7 Lego sets and promotional polybag as part of Lego Minions: The Rise of Gru theme. The product line was eventually discontinued by the end of December 2022.

In 2020, The Lego Group announced a partnership with Universal Pictures and Illumination to create a licensing and merchandising programme based on the Minions: The Rise of Gru film which was released on 14 March 2020. Two sets were Unstoppable Bike Chase (set number: 75549) and Brick-Built Minions and Their Lair (set number: 75551). Later, the Lego Group announced the three sets delayed until 26 April 2021 due to indefinite hiatus while Universal Pictures landed on a firm release date for its animated sequel, which is now scheduled to premiere in July 2022. Three sets were Minions in Gru's Lab (set number: 75546), Minion Pilot in Training (set number: 75547) and Minions Kung Fu Battle (set number: 75550). In addition, Bob Minion with Robot Arms (set number: 30387) polybag set was released as a promotion. These included two key chains attached to the minifigures of Otto and Stuart. Minions Kung Fu Training (set number: 40511) is an accessory pack was released on 1 July 2021. The sets were designed primarily for children with an age rating of 4+ or above.

Minions in Gru's Lab
Minions in Gru's Lab (set number: 75546) was released on 26 April 2021. The set consists of 87 pieces with 2 minifigures. The lab included an orange slide, the washing machine, the short roller coaster track for the rocket-powered vehicle to slide and a yellow railing can store the tools. The set included Lego minifigures of Kevin and Otto. This set is specifically designed to be simpler to build with fewer pieces and slightly larger building elements. In August 2021, The Lego Group announced the Minions in Gru's Lab (set number: 75546) was retired on 31 December 2022.

Minion Pilot in Training
Minion Pilot in Training (set number: 75547) was released on 26 April 2021. The set consists of 119 pieces with 2 minifigures. The private plane included the detachable roof, an opening cockpit for Stuart, the passenger cabin for Bob, the bathroom and an opening the hinged cargo bay door can store all the accessories and banana as well. The set included Lego minifigures of Bob and Stuart. This sets is specifically designed to be simpler to build with fewer pieces and slightly larger building elements. In August 2021, The Lego Group announced the Minion Pilot in Training (set number: 75547) was retired on 31 December 2022.

Unstoppable Bike Chase
Unstoppable Bike Chase (set number: 75549) was released on 14 March 2020. The set consists of 136 pieces with 3 minifigures. Gru's jet-powered motorcycle included the elaborate headlights, handlebars, decorative skull emblem and black rear view mirrors. The rocket skates included a silver chain can connect to Gru's jet-powered motorcycle, a wrench and a banana. The set included Lego minifigures of Gru, Stuart and Bob. In August 2021, The Lego Group announced the Unstoppable Bike Chase (set number: 75549) was retired on 31 December 2021.

Minions Kung Fu Battle
Minions Kung Fu Battle (set number: 75550) was released on 26 April 2021. The set consists of 310 pieces with 3 minifigures. The Chinese temple included the weapon rack can store weapons, rotating training dummy and the Chinese dragon. It also included a sword and a banana. The set included Lego minifigures of Kevin, Otto and Stuart. In August 2021, The Lego Group announced the Minions Kung Fu Battle (set number: 75550) was retired on 31 December 2022.

Brick-Built Minions and Their Lair
Brick-Built Minions and Their Lair (set number: 75551) was released on 14 March 2020. The set consists of 876 pieces with 3 minifigures. The two buildable models are Kevin and Stuart can open to reveal a room. Kevin buildable model can be rebuilt as Bob. The set included Lego minifigures of Bob, Kevin and Stuart. In August 2021, The Lego Group announced the Brick-Built Minions and Their Lair (set number: 75551) was retired on 31 December 2022.

Lego BrickHeadz sets 
Two sets were released as part of the Lego BrickHeadz theme. The two sets were Gru, Stuart and Otto (set number: 40420) and Belle Bottom, Kevin and Bob (set number: 40421) were be released in April 2021 and based on the Minions: The Rise of Gru film.

Gru, Stuart and Otto 
Gru, Stuart and Otto (set number: 40420) was released in April 2021 as part of the Lego BrickHeadz theme. The set consists of 244 pieces and 3 baseplates. In August 2021, The Lego Group announced Gru, Stuart and Otto (set number: 40420) was retired on 31 December 2022.

Belle Bottom, Kevin and Bob 
Belle Bottom, Kevin and Bob (set number: 40421) was released in April 2021 as part of the Lego BrickHeadz theme. The set consists of 309 pieces and 3 baseplates. In August 2021, The Lego Group announced Belle Bottom, Kevin and Bob (set number: 40421) was retired on 31 December 2021.

Web short

Lego Minions: The Kung Fu Master (2021 Short) 
Lego Minions: The Kung Fu Master is an official web short released on YouTube on 7 July 2021 that inspired by both the Lego toyline as well as the Minions: The Rise of Gru film. It features the Minions learn how to be Kung Fu masters.

App 
The crossover game app, titled Despicable Me: Minion Rush was released on June 13, 2013. The game app was developed by Gameloft for iPhone, iPad, Android and Windows Phone devices. Played as one of the Minions, it allows customization of the character, who must perform various tasks, including defeating Vector and a new villain created for the game, to earn the title of Minion of the Year. In August 2021, the game app received an updated a new festival event that brings the world of Lego into the app in the first brick-based crossover for the games.

Reception 
In September 2021, Catherine Bushen of Chicago Tribune had reviewed the Brick-Built Minions and Their Lair (set number: 75551) and stated, "This set is ideal for youngsters who love the challenge of constructing their toys before playing with them."

See also 
 Despicable Me
 Lego Monster Fighters
 Lego Jurassic World (theme)
 Lego Trolls World Tour
 Lego Vidiyo

References

External links 
 Official website

Lego themes
Products introduced in 2020
Universal Pictures franchises
Illumination (company) franchises
Products and services discontinued in 2022